William Burgess may refer to:
 William Burgess (cricketer) (1888–1970), English cricketer
 William Burgess (painter) (died 1812), English painter
 William Burgess (politician) (1847–1917), member of the Tasmanian Parliament
 Bill Burgess (rugby league, born 1897), English rugby league footballer who played in the 1910s, 1920s and 1930s
 Bill Burgess (rugby, born 1939), English rugby union, and rugby league footballer who played in the 1960s and 1970s
 William Burgess (sailor) (born 1930), Canadian yacht racer
 William J. Burgess (died 1996), American politician
 William Oakley Burgess (died 1844), engraver
 William Starling Burgess (1878–1947), American yacht designer, aviation pioneer, and naval architect
 H. William Burgess (1929–2016), Hawaiian lawyer
 Ron Burgess (footballer) (William Arthur Ronald Burgess, 1917–2005), Welsh international association football player, and later manager

See also
 Bill Burgess (disambiguation)
 William Burges (1827–1881), English architect and designer
 William Burges (politician) (1806/8–1876), early settler in Western Australia
 William Sinclair-Burgess (1880–1964), New Zealand Army major general who served with Australian Forces during World War I